Germanus I may refer to:

 Germanus I, Patriarch of Bulgaria c. 972 – c. 990
 Germanus I of Constantinople, Ecumenical Patriarch in 715–730